This is a list of banks in Estonia, based on information from the Financial Supervisory Authority.

Licensed credit institutions in Estonia
Bigbank
Coop Pank
Holm Bank
Inbank
LHV Pank
Luminor Bank
SEB Pank
Swedbank
TBB pank

Affiliated branches of foreign credit institutions
Citadele banka Eesti filiaal
Nordea Bank Abp Eesti filiaal
OP Corporate Bank plc Eesti filiaal
PayEx Sverige AB Eesti filiaal
TF Bank AB (publ.) Eesti filiaal

References

 
 
Estonia
Banks
Estonia